Caberfae is an unincorporated community and census-designated place (CDP) in Wexford County in the U.S. state of Michigan.  The community is located within Slagle Township to the north and South Branch Township to the south.  The population of the CDP was 72 at the 2020 census.

History
Caberfae was named by Kenneth MacKenzie after the Cabar Feiah, a historic Gaelic symbol.  The community served as the Caberfae Ranch, a private hunting club that was eventually sold to the United States during the Great Depression.  It became part of the Manistee National Forest.  It is now home to the Caberfae Peaks Ski & Golf Resort, a mix of government-owned and private property.

The community of Caberfae was listed as a newly-organized census-designated place for the 2010 census, meaning it now has officially defined boundaries and population statistics for the first time.

Geography

Demographics

Education
Caberfae is served entirely by Cadillac Area Public Schools to the southeast in the city of Cadillac.

References

Unincorporated communities in Wexford County, Michigan
Unincorporated communities in Michigan
Census-designated places in Wexford County, Michigan
Census-designated places in Michigan